Callistratus, Greek sophist and rhetorician, probably flourished in the 3rd (or possibly 4th) century CE.  He wrote  (also known by the Latin title , and Greek title ), descriptions of fourteen works of art in stone or brass by distinguished artists.  This little work is usually edited with the Eikones of Philostratus (whose form it imitates).

References

Bibliography 
 Editions of the Greek text
 Edition by C. Schenkl and E. Reisch (Teubner series, 1902)
 C. G. Heyne, Opuscula Academica, v. pp. 196–221, with commentary on the Descriptiones
 A. Fairbanks, Loeb Classical Library edition (with Philostratus), with English translation (1931)
 Balbina Bäbler and Heinz-Günther Nesselrath, Ars et verba: die Kunstbeschreibungen des Kallistratos, Greek text with introduction, annotations, and archeological commentary in German.  Munich and Leipzig: K.G. Saur, 2006.
 F. Jacobs, Animadversiones criticae in Callistrati statuas (1797)
 Michel Costantini, Françoise Graziani, Stéphane Rolet, Le défi de l'art. Philostrate, Callistrate et l'image sophistique. Rennes: Presses Universitaires de Rennes, 2006.

External links
Flavii Philostrati opera, C. L. Kayser (edit.), 2 voll., Lipsiae, in aedibus B. G. Teubneri, 1870–71, vol. 2 pp. 421-438.
Philostratus: Imagines. Callistratus: Descriptiones, Arthur Fairbanks (edit.), London: William Heinemann LTD, New York: G. P. Putnam's Sons, 1931, pp. 375-424.
Philostrati minoris imagines et Callistrati descriptiones, C. Shenkl - A. Reisch (ed.), Lipsiae, in aedibus B. G. Teubneri, 1902.
Philostratorum et Callistrati opera, Eunapii vitae sophistarum, Himerii sophistae declamationes, A. Westermann, Jo. Fr. Boissoade, Fr. Dübner (ed.), Parisiis, editore Ambrosio Firmin Didot, 1849, pp. 415-424.

Roman-era Sophists